Nicole Dubré-Chirat (born 18 December 1951) is a French politician of La République En Marche! (LREM) who has been serving as a member of the National Assembly since 18 June 2017, representing the department of Maine-et-Loire.

Political career
In parliament, Dubré-Chirat serves on the Committee on Legal Affairs. In addition to her committee assignments, she is part of the French-Bulgarian Parliamentary Friendship Group, the French-Slovakian Parliamentary Friendship Group, and the French-Montenegrin Parliamentary Friendship Group.

Political positions
In July 2019, Dubré-Chirat voted in favor of the French ratification of the European Union’s Comprehensive Economic and Trade Agreement (CETA) with Canada.

See also
 2017 French legislative election

References

1951 births
Living people
Deputies of the 15th National Assembly of the French Fifth Republic
La République En Marche! politicians
21st-century French women politicians
Place of birth missing (living people)
Women members of the National Assembly (France)
Deputies of the 16th National Assembly of the French Fifth Republic